The Aspen Strategy Group (ASG) is a policy program of the Aspen Institute, based in Washington D.C. The ASG is a membership-based forum composed of current and former policymakers, academics, journalists, and business leaders whose aim is to explore the preeminent foreign policy and national security challenges facing the United States.

The main activities include its annual Summer Workshop meeting in Aspen, several Track II dialogues such as the U.S.-India Strategic Dialogue and the U.S.-China Strategic Dialogue,   and the Aspen Ministers Forum, led by Madeleine K. Albright, which convenes former foreign ministers from around the world to focus on international security.

History
The roots date back to the 1970s, when the Aspen Institute organized the annual conference for scientists that worked on projects for arms control, which developed the Aspen Strategy Group, and is an official program of the Aspen Institute since 1984. Their original focus was on strategic relations, arms control and the US-Soviet Union relationship. The Aspen Strategy Group is made up of  members of parliament, government officials, industry representatives, and journalists. Since the end of the Cold War, the group analysis regional and global challenges and examines the economic, social and transnational consequences. The current focus is the issue of international health, energy and environmental policy. The assessments take into account the national interests of the US. The Aspen Strategy Group brings together representatives of different political groups.

Leadership
 R. Nicholas Burns,  Executive Director
Anja Manuel, Director
 Joseph Nye, Co-Chair 
 Condoleezza Rice, Co-Chair

References

External links

Aspen Strategy Group team official site

Foreign policy and strategy think tanks in the United States
Political and economic think tanks in the United States
Nonpartisan organizations in the United States
Non-profit organizations based in Washington, D.C.
1984 establishments in the United States